Lol Lol Peul is a Senegalese village located in the town of Louga, Louga Region.

Populated places in Louga Region